Engine House No. 10 may refer to:

 Engine House No. 10 (Columbus, Ohio)
 Engine House No. 10 (Washington, D.C.)